Milan Mujkoš (born 28 May 1986) is a Slovak football defender who currently plays for the DOXXbet liga club ŠKF Sereď.

External links
 
 Eurofotbal.cz profile

References

1986 births
Living people
Slovak footballers
Association football defenders
FK Dubnica players
MŠK Rimavská Sobota players
FK Slovan Duslo Šaľa players
FC ViOn Zlaté Moravce players
Slovak Super Liga players
People from Prievidza District
Sportspeople from the Trenčín Region